Dolní Slivno is a municipality and village in Mladá Boleslav District in the Central Bohemian Region of the Czech Republic. It has about 400 inhabitants.

Administrative parts
The village of Slivínko is an administrative part of Dolní Slivno.

References

Villages in Mladá Boleslav District